Magen Shaul is a moshav in northern Israel. Located near Mount Gilboa, it falls under the jurisdiction of Gilboa Regional Council.

History
Magen Shaul  was founded in 1976 by children of families who lived in other moshavim of the Ta'anakh region. The name "Magen Shaul" is borrowed from the elegy that David proclaimed after Saul died in a battle against the Philistines in the surrounding area. The economy was initially based on roses grown in hothouses.

In the early 2000s, ten Christian Zionist families from Canada immigrated to Israel and settled in Magen Shaul. They established Gilboa Tooling Industries, a manufacturing company that exports its products to the aerospace and medical industries around the world. They also established a vocational school to train metalworking trades in order to support the manufacturing sector of the Israeli industry.

References 

1976 establishments in Israel
Canadian diaspora in Israel
Christian Zionism in Israel
Moshavim
Populated places established in 1976
Populated places in Northern District (Israel)